Willi und die Windzors ("Willi and the Windzors") is a 1996 German comedic television film. Produced under the impression of the continued scandals surrounding members of the British royal family during the mid-1990s, the parody film presents an alternate history in which Britain becomes a republic, resulting in Queen Elizabeth II and her family (the Windsors, which is deliberately misspelled in the title) being expelled from their country and moving in with relatives in Germany. The film was directed by Hape Kerkeling, who also appears as the titular character, Willi Bettenberg (cf. Battenberg and the House of Mountbatten), the royal family's (fictitious) next of kin.

Synopsis

Due to the "unmoralic behavior" of the royal family and the high cost of maintaining the royal court, the British parliament passes a bill to abolish the monarchy with immediate effect. Queen Elizabeth II (Irm Hermann, depicted as the stone-hearted head of the family), Queen Elizabeth The Queen Mother (Brigitte Mira), Prince Philip, Duke of Edinburgh (Charles Brauer), who is shown to have a dysfunctional relationship with his son, Charles, Prince of Wales (Ludger Pistor), as well as Diana, Princess of Wales (Katharina Schubert) (who is shown to blossom out having lost any royal obligations), Princess Margaret, Countess of Snowdon (who is depicted as a deranged drinker), and the Princes William and Harry have to leave the country. Sarah, Duchess of York, and Prince Andrew, Duke of York, instead become members of the British workforce to pay off their mounting debt.

In Hanover, Germany, Willi Bettenberg (Hape Kerkeling) lives in a small house together with his mother (Tana Schanzara), struggling to make a living out of a furniture store. It turns out that he is the next relative of the British royal family, and suddenly finds them loaded off at his doorstep. As the royal family arrives without any money, Willi has them pay off for their stay by giving an autograph session at the furniture store, which greatly increases customer popularity and revenues. The former Queen turns out to be a great presenter of furniture, and Philipp's knowledge as a hunter makes him a highly regarded expert to the local zoo.

Getting accustomed to his new life, Prince Charles begins to write children's stories and finds a new love in Willi's fiancée, a masculine riding instructor. By contrast, Willi falls in love with Diana, which is met with high approval by his mother.

In order to find a new occupation and provide his family with a new home, Prince Charles runs as mayor of Hanover, the necessary funding having been won by Prince Philip during a horse race. Charles succeeds in winning the election, and the royal family takes up its new residence at the Hannover New Town Hall.

In the meantime, Great Britain feels the negative effects of not having a royal family anymore, with journalism and tourism being hit the hardest and hundreds and thousands of jobs having been lost. As a consequence, the British government decides to reinstate the monarchy. Prince Charles is asked to become the next king, but refuses in favor of his new life in Hanover. Instead, Willi marries Diana and becomes King William V.

Production details

The film was produced by and originally aired at Norddeutscher Rundfunk. Filming took place in Hanover and Papenburg. The film opens and closes with a narrative by Hans Paetsch, whose distinctive voice is well known to a German audience because of his frequent work as teller of fairy tales.

References

External links 
 
 Willi und die Windzors, at youtube.com

1996 films
1996 television films
German television films
1990s German-language films
German-language television shows
1990s parody films
Films about Elizabeth II
Films about Diana, Princess of Wales
Films set in Germany
Films set in the United Kingdom
Cultural depictions of Charles III
German alternate history films
1996 comedy films
1990s German films
Das Erste original programming